The Disturbance of the Three Ports, also known as Sampo Waeran  or Sanpo no Ran, refers to riots in 1510 by Japanese citizens residing in the Korean port cities Dongnae, Changwon and Ulsan.

Summary
At the beginning of the Joseon dynasty, due to frequent attacks by the wokou, the Korean government adopted a hardline foreign policy and stationed troops near the port of Busan to enforce it. From 1407 to 1426, the Korean government modified this policy by gradually opening several ports to trade with Japan.

By 1426 three ports were open to Japanese trade: Busan, Naei and Yeom. In the territories here Japanese merchants were allowed to operate, designated as waegwan, the Japanese population surpassed 2000. The local Japanese government on Tsushima Island assumed responsibility for governing the Japanese residents, who came to number over 2,000. Local farmers who owned land on which cotton was grown for export to Japan wanted to collect taxes on it, but the Korean government, in an attempt to improve foreign relations with Japan, exempted the Japanese from this tax.

When King Jungjong of Joseon succeeded his half-brother King Yeonsangun of Joseon to the throne, the Korean government implemented reforms that included the elimination of tax breaks for Japanese citizens. Due to this increased tax burden, the Japanese petitioned the government on Tsushima Island for relief. Japan had ships off the Korean coast to enforce laws and provided military support to Japanese citizens living in Korea.

In April 1510, two Japanese men, Obarishi and Yasko, led between 4000 and 5000 armed and armored men in an attack on Busan, Naei, Yeom, and the castle located at Naei. Concurrently, a Sō clan fleet attacked Geoje Island. Afterward, the Japanese gathered at Naei Port. A military general stationed at Busan, Yi U-jeung (李友曾), was killed and the leader at the Naei port, Kim Sae-gyun (金世鈞), was kidnapped. Yu Dam-nyeon (柳聃年) and Hwang Hyeong (黃衡) were immediately sent by the Korean government to suppress the riots. The Korean military promptly recaptured Naei Port, and the surviving Japanese fled to Tsushima. As a result, the son of Sō Yoshimori (宗義盛), the governor of Tsushima Island, was killed and the riots were subdued.

Results
The riots resulted in 270 Korean civilians killed, 796 homes destroyed, 295 Japanese people killed, and five Japanese ships sunk. The Joseon government sent relief to people living in the affected regions and deported all remaining Japanese people to Tsushima Island. When the dead from the riots were buried, the graves of the Japanese were marked differently, to warn future visitors to Korea of the consequences of participating in riots.

After the riots, all commercial activity between the two countries ended. This negatively affected the Japanese people living on Tsushima Island and Japanese citizens demanded a re-opening of the ports.

In 1512, the shogun of Japan responded by publicly punishing Sō Yoshimori (宗義盛), the leader of Tsushima Island, who was responsible for causing the riots in Korea, and repatriated Korean prisoners of war that had been living in Japan. Koreans accepted this peace offering from the shogun and the two countries entered into the Treaty of Imsin (壬申約條) in 1512. The agreement reopened the port at Naei to commercial activity; however, the number of Japanese ships and citizens allowed in Korea remained lower than before the riots.

See also
History of Korea
Military history of Korea

References

Japan–Korea relations
1510s conflicts
1510 in Asia
Riots and civil disorder in Korea
Anti-Japanese sentiment in Korea
Anti-Korean sentiment in Japan